is a passenger railway station  located in the city of Iyo, Ehime Prefecture, Japan. It is operated by JR Shikoku and has the station number "U02-1".

Lines

Layout
The station consists of a side platform serving a single track. The platform is equipped with a weather shelter and a "tickets corner", a small shelter housing an automatic ticket vending machine. A ramp leads up to the platform from the access road.

History
On 26 November 2018, JR Shikoku announced the planned construction of the station, as part of a modernization project in the Matsuyama area. The station name comes from an old village that used to be in the area.

The station opened on 14 March 2020, at a cost of 170 million yen.  A new Matsuyama Freight Terminal was also built next to the station.

Surrounding area
 Japan Freight Railway (JR Freight) Matsuyama Freight Station
 Matsumae Town National Athletic Memorial Hockey Park
 Iyo City Iyo Junior High School
 Iyo Municipal Iyo Elementary School

See also
 List of railway stations in Japan

References

External links
Station timetable

Railway stations in Ehime Prefecture
Railway stations in Japan opened in 2020
Iyo, Ehime